Jabbeke railway staiton is a former Belgian railway station on Line 50A from Brussels to Ostend located in Jabbeke, in the commune of the same name, in the Flemish Region of the province of West Flanders.

The station was opened in 1838 by Belgian State Railways and was closed to traffic in 1984.

Railway location 
Until it was closed in 1984, Jabbeke railway station was located at kilometer point (PK) 101.81 of Line 50A, from Brussels to Ostend, between the stations located at Varsenare and Ouden, both also closed.

History 
The station was opened on August 18, 1838, by the Belgian State Railways. It was, with Plassendaele (Oudenburg), the only stop between Bruges and Ostend.

At first only a railway stop, administered from Bruges in 1848, then becoming a station in its own right with a revenue-collecting building. A first building on the site, of an unknown appearance, operated from 1875 before being replaced by the current structure, erected between 1892 and 1894.

It is built to the 1881 railway station plan with a wing of three bays on the left.

The SNCB, arguing a decline in passenger traffic, decided to close all stations along Line  50A between Bruges and Ostend; the station closed as part of Plan IC-IR, on June 3, 1984.

After several years of abandonment, the station building was sold and converted into housing.

Gallery

References 

Railway stations in Belgium opened in 1838
Railway stations in Belgium closed in 1984